USS Marie has been the name of more than one United States Navy ship, and may refer to:

 , a patrol boat in commission from June 1917 to August 1919
 , a patrol boat in commission from October 1917 to January 1919

United States Navy ship names